Events from the year 1539 in India.

Events
 Guru Angad Dev becomes second guru of Sikhism.
 Suhungmung's reign as king of Ahom ends with his death (began 1497).
 Suklenmung succeeds his father as king of Ahom (reigns until 1552)

Births

Deaths
 Suhungmung, king of Ahom

See also

 Timeline of Indian history

 
India